Hogback Mountain is part of Catoctin Mountain, located southwest of Leesburg in Loudoun County, Virginia. It is so named for its appearance when approaching it from the north of resembling a pig on its back. The ridge is mislabeled on older USGS topographic maps as being located to the north, between Sycolin Creek and Leesburg.

References
 Scheel, Eugene.  Loudoun Discovered:Communities, Corners and Crossroads. Vol. 2. 2002, p. 100.

Ridges of Virginia
Landforms of Loudoun County, Virginia